Jamestown Museum is a local history museum which tells the history of Jamestown, Rhode Island and is run by the Jamestown Historical Society. The Jamestown Historical Society founded the museum in the current building in 1971.  The building was originally as a one-room school dating from 1885, which later served as the town library from 1898 to 1971. The museum was extensively renovated in 2008. The Jamestown Historical Society also operates several other historic building museums, such as the Jamestown Windmill (1787).

References

External links
 

History museums in Rhode Island
Historical society museums in Rhode Island
Museums in Newport County, Rhode Island
Buildings and structures in Jamestown, Rhode Island